The Ojai Playwrights Conference is a new play development program based in Ojai, California. The mission of the organization is to develop unproduced plays of artistic excellence that focus on the compelling social, political and cultural issues of our era from diverse playwrights both emerging and established, and to nurture a new generation of playwrights and theatre artists.

Activities 
Each summer playwrights, directors, dramaturges, and other theatre professionals gather in Ojai for a two-week conference culminating in a New Works Festival, in which new plays are presented in staged readings, and audiences are invited to join in post-play discussions. The readings, performed by professional actors, generally occur at Zalk Theater on the campus of Ojai's Besant Hill School. In addition to the new play workshops, the Festival also features various performance events and presentations of original works by conference interns and youth workshop program participants. 

Founded in 1998, the not-for-profit arts organization was led by artistic director and producer Robert Egan from 2001 until 2022. Under his leadership, the Ojai Playwrights Conference has grown over the years in the number of artists served, the diversity of its artists and leadership. In 2019, the Ojai Playwrights Conference was awarded the Gordon Davidson Award for distinguished contribution to the Los Angeles theatrical community by the LA Drama Critics Circle.

Plays developed at the Ojai Playwrights Conference have been performed on Broadway, in the West End, off-Broadway, and at regional theatres. Both "Fun Home" and "Other Desert Cities" were workshopped at the Ojai Playwrights Conference and were Pulitzer Finalists; "Fun Home" won the Tony Award for Best Musical, and Caroline, or Change won the Laurence Olivier Award for Best New Musical. "Eclipsed" and The Motherfucker with the Hat were each nominated for the Tony Award for Best Play.

Plays 
The following plays have been developed through the Ojai Playwrights Conference:
 Other Desert Cities by Jon Robin Baitz
 The Motherfucker With the Hat by Stephen Adly Guirgis
 Between Riverside and Crazy by Stephen Adly Guirgis
 In the Continuum by Danai Gurira and Nikkole Salter
 Eclipsed by Danai Gurira
 God Spies by Bill Cain
 Geometry of Fire by Stephen Belber
 The Little Flower of East Orange by Stephen Adly Guirgis
 Well by Lisa Kron
 Caroline, or Change by Jeanie Tesori and Tony Kushner

Further reading
 Margaret Gray (August 22, 2022). Conversation Starters: How Robert Egan Put Ojai Playwrights on the Map. American Theatre
 Rachel Lee Harris (July 6, 2009). California Samples New York Playwrights.  The New York Times 158 (54728), p. C2

References

External links 
Ojai Playwrights Conference
City of Ojai
Ojai Festivals
Theater 150
Besant Hill School

Theatre festivals in the United States
Ojai, California
Tourist attractions in Ventura County, California